Anatomy is the fourth studio album by dream pop band Drugstore. It was released in 2011, following an eight-year hiatus by the band, and available both as a CD and as a limited edition clear vinyl. The album was recorded at Panic Button Studios with Steve Lyon on Platts Eyot, Hampton, a small island in the River Thames.

Artwork
The cover of Anatomy features singer-songwriter Isabel Monteiro on a deserted beach holding a pistol. It was shot at Stone Bay, in Broadstairs, Kent.

Track listing
All songs by Isabel Monteiro

References

2011 albums
Drugstore (band) albums